Dastardly and Muttley in Their Flying Machines (or simply Dastardly and Muttley in the UK and Ireland) is an American animated television series produced by Hanna-Barbera Productions, and a spin-off from Wacky Races. The show was originally broadcast as a Saturday morning cartoon, airing from September 13, 1969, to January 3, 1970, on CBS. The show focuses on the efforts of Dick Dastardly and his canine sidekick Muttley to catch Yankee Doodle Pigeon, a carrier pigeon who carries secret messages (hence the name of the show's theme song "Stop the Pigeon"). The title is a reference to the film and song Those Magnificent Men in Their Flying Machines.

The original working title of the show was Stop That Pigeon. The peppy and memorable theme song by William Hanna and Joseph Barbera (based on the jazz standard "Tiger Rag") has a chorus that repeats the phrase "Stop the pigeon" seven times in a row.

The show had only two voice actors: Paul Winchell as Dick Dastardly, the indistinctly heard General and other characters and Don Messick as Muttley, Klunk, Zilly and other characters. Each 22-minute episode was broadcast over half an hour on the network, including network breaks, and contained: two Dastardly & Muttley stories, one Magnificent Muttley story (Muttley's Walter Mitty-style daydreams), and two or three short Wing Dings (brief gags to break up the longer stories).

Plot
In Germany, Dick Dastardly and Muttley, the villains from Wacky Races, are now flying aces in World War I-styled aeroplanes and members of the Vulture Squadron, on a mission to stop a messenger pigeon named Yankee Doodle Pigeon from delivering top-secret messages to an opposing army.  The other members of the Squadron are Klunk, an inventor who speaks an unintelligible language (punctuated by howls, clicks, whistles, and growls, accompanied by bizarre facial contortions), and Zilly, a panicky pilot whose main role is to translate for Klunk, and who tries to desert the mission at any given opportunity.

Each story features variations on the same plot elements: the Vulture Squadron sets out to trap Yankee Doodle Pigeon, a process which begins with Zilly trying to escape and being retrieved by Muttley, and Klunk introducing a plan that involves using one or more planes equipped with his latest contraptions. Inevitably, either the plan is flawed, or one or more of the Squadron messes up and the plane(s) either crash, collide or explode (or all of the above). While they are falling out of the wreckage, Dick Dastardly calls for help, which Muttley offers depending on whether Dastardly either agrees or disagrees to give him medals. Even when Muttley does agree to fly Dastardly out of trouble, Dastardly seldom has a soft landing. At some point the General calls Dastardly on the phone to demand results, and while Dastardly assures him that they will soon capture the pigeon, the General usually disbelieves him and bellows unintelligibly to Dastardly through the phone and extends his hand from it to either grab Dastardly by the nose or his mustache. By the end of every story, Yankee Doodle Pigeon escapes while the Vulture Squadron is often left in backfiring predicaments.

In a contemporary comic book/comic digest series of Dastardly and Muttley in Their Flying Machines, Dastardly and Muttley still failed to stop Yankee Doodle Pigeon, except for three times: the first time when accidentally knocking out and capturing Yankee Doodle Pigeon with falling ice cubes; Dastardly and Muttley finding to their surprise that the pigeon's satchel contained nothing but moths. The second time, they salted his tail for the purpose of again retrieving his satchel, only to discover it contained a jigsaw puzzle that read "Sucker!", while the pigeon had the real message under his helmet. The third time, Dastardly and Muttley lured Yankee Doodle to their side during a 24-hour truce, hypnotized him and set him up to be a traitor.

The show also featured Wing Dings, short clips with jokes, and Magnificent Muttley, where Muttley encounters Walter Mitty-esque daydreams.

Magnificent Muttley
There was one Magnificent Muttley episode in each of the 17 broadcast episodes.  Muttley is the main character and imagines himself in a lot of situations, with Dastardly in the role of the villain; each episode was about three minutes long. Dastardly's car from Wacky Races made a cameo in a few of these shorts, namely "The Marvelous Muttdini" and "Admiral Bird Dog".

List of episodes
Episode credits: Story: Larz Bourne; Dalton Sandifer; Mike Maltese. Story direction: Alex Lovy, Bill Perez

Voice cast
 Paul Winchell as Dick Dastardly the First . Winchell also voices the General as well as an occasional guest character.
 Don Messick as Muttley, Klunk and Zilly. Messick voices the Narrator and practically all of the guest characters.

Syndication
After its original CBS run, Dastardly and Muttley was shown in syndicated reruns on local stations between 1976 and 1982.  Some episodes were subsequently distributed on VHS tape by Worldvision Enterprises.

Home video
On May 10, 2005, Warner Home Video released the complete series on Region 1 DVD.  On July 31, 2006, the series was released on DVD R2 in the United Kingdom, but only in HMV stores and its online site as an HMV Exclusive.

References in popular culture
Rockabilly/psychobilly group The Reverend Horton Heat covered the theme song in 1995 as a medley with the theme song from Jonny Quest on the cover album Saturday Morning: Cartoons' Greatest Hits with other various artists.

Hip-Hop group Madvillain references the characters in their song "Accordion" off their debut album Madvillainy.

In the BBC Robin Hood episode "Lardner's Ring", when Robin Hood is trying to send a message to King Richard via pigeon, at one point the Sheriff of Nottingham yells out "We must catch the pigeon! Catch the pigeon NOW!" Despite being a British show, the writer was obviously familiar with this show, as the Sheriff said it exactly the same way as Dastardly.

Other appearances and renditions 
Yankee Doodle Pigeon and Klunk appear in the 2021 cartoon series Jellystone! with Klunk voiced by Fajer Al-Kaisi. Yankee Doodle Pigeon made background appearances. Klunk appears in "Lady Danjjer: Is It Wrong to Long for Kabong?" where he steals Jabberjaw's ice cream that she got from Shazzan only to be defeated by El Kabong.

Yankee Doodle Pigeon appears stuffed and mounted in Dick Dastardly's quarters aboard his flying machine in the 2020 animated film Scoob!.

Mumbly and Dread Baron, who "bear a strong resemblance" to Muttley and Dick Dastardly, appear in Hanna-Barbera's Laff-A-Lympics in 1978. The character changes came due to licensing issues. Dread Baron is later to be revealed as Dick Dastardly's brother in the Laff-A-Lympics comic books.

See also
 Dick Dastardly
 Muttley
 Saturday Morning: Cartoons' Greatest Hits
 Yogi's Treasure Hunt
 Scoob!
 List of works produced by Hanna-Barbera Productions
 List of Hanna-Barbera characters
 United States Army Pigeon Service

References

External links

Toonopedia's entry on Dastardly and Muttley

CBS original programming
American animated television spin-offs
1969 American television series debuts
1970 American television series endings
1960s American animated television series
Television series by Hanna-Barbera
Aviation television series
American children's animated comedy television series
Wacky Races spin-offs
Animated television series about dogs
English-language television shows